This article contains a timeline of major events in the history of Dallas, Texas (USA).  It serves as an abridged supplement to the main history article for the city and its several subarticles on periods in the city's history.

19th century 

1841 - Dallas was founded.
1888 - The Dallas Zoo opens, making it the second zoological garden in the country.
 1890 – Population: 38,067.
 1900 – Population: 42,638.

20th century

1900s-1950s
 1901 - Dallas Public Library opens.
1903 - Dallas annexes town of Oak Cliff on the south side of the Trinity River, expanding its size by a third.
1908 - The Great Trinity River flood
 1910 – Population: 92,104.
 1917 - October 19: U.S. military Love Field (airfield) is created.
 1920
 WRR radio begins broadcasting.
 Population: 158,976.
 1921 - Kirbys Pig Stand eatery in business.
1922 - The Magnolia Building opens.  Its trademark neon Pegasus that would be erected in 1934 would come to be one of the city's most recognizable landmarks and representative of the city itself.
1927
 Love Field (airport) is opened for civilian use.
 The world's first convenience store is opened in Dallas by the Southland Ice Company, which will eventually become 7-Eleven.
1930
 C. M. Joiner strikes oil 100 miles (160 km) northeast of Dallas. Dallas became a center of commerce for the Texas oil trade.
 Bonnie and Clyde meet in the West Dallas neighborhood of Dallas and begin their crime spree across Texas, Oklahoma, and Louisiana.
 Population: 260,475.
1934 - The criminal duo Bonnie and Clyde are buried in Dallas after being killed by police in Louisiana on May 23.
 1949 - WFAA-TV and KRLD-TV (television) begin broadcasting.
1958 - While working for Texas Instruments, Jack Kilby created the world's first integrated circuit at a Dallas laboratory in September, sparking an electronics revolution that changed the world and created a global market now worth more than $1 trillion a year.

1960s-1990s
1963 - November 22 - United States President John F. Kennedy was assassinated in a motorcade traveling west on Elm Street in Dealey Plaza.  This event is memorialized by the nearby Kennedy Memorial and by the Sixth Floor Museum in the former Texas School Book Depository at the corner of Elm and Houston, Kennedy died at Parkland Memorial Hospital, 30 minutes after the shooting. 
 1968 - Cooper Aerobics Center in business.
 1972 - City logo design adopted.
1974 - Dallas/Fort Worth International Airport opens.
1976 - Thanks-Giving Square is completed in downtown Dallas.
1978 - The soap opera Dallas debuts with a CBS miniseries that was filmed entirely in Dallas. The actual series was later almost all filmed in a Los Angeles studio.  The internationally popular show ran for 13 years.
1979 - US Congress passes the Wright Amendment, restricting passenger air service out of Love Field Airport.
1981 - , a nuclear submarine named after the city, is commissioned.
1984 - Dallas hosts the 1984 Republican National Convention
1985
 The 72-story Bank of America Plaza (then InterFirst Plaza) opens as the tallest building in Dallas.
 Dallas Municipal Archives established.
 Teatro Dallas (bilingual theatre) founded.
1987 - Annette Strauss is inaugurated as the first female mayor of Dallas.
 1990 – Population: 1,006,877.
 1993 - Old 97's musical group formed.
1994 - Dallas hosts the 1994 World Cup through the quarter-finals.
1996 - Dallas Area Rapid Transit begins operating the first light rail system in Texas (and the Southwest) and first commuter rail in Texas.
1997 - Congress passes the Shelby Amendment, which eases some of the Wright Amendment restrictions on Love Field Airport.
2000 - December 18 - Dallas Area Rapid Transit opens the first full-service subway station in Texas (and the American South), Cityplace Station.

January 2000, just a few months into the season. The deal has proven to be a financial success for Cuban and the team. The Mavericks are currently valued at $2.7 billion —  ninth-highest in the NBA — according to Forbes.

21st century 
 2010 - Population: city 1,197,816; megaregion 19,728,244.
2014 - September 7 - Dallas is the home of the first case of the Ebola Virus in the United States.
2016 - July 7 - A mass shooting targeting police officers during a protest occurs in downtown Dallas, resulting in the deaths of five officers along with the shooter, and the injuries of nine other officers and two civilians.
2019 - June 17 - A brief shooting occurs outside of the Earle Cabell Federal Building, leading to the death of the perpetrator and the injury of one other person.

See also
 Timelines of other cities in the North Texas area of Texas: Arlington, Denton, Fort Worth, Garland, Irving, Plano, Wichita Falls

References

Bibliography

External links
 
 

 
dallas